The Icknield Port Loop (originally the Rotton Park Loop) is a  loop of the eighteenth-century-built Old BCN Main Line canal in Birmingham, England, about  west of the city centre, which opened to traffic on 6 November 1769 and in some definitions includes its straighter bypass built in September 1827, a  section of the New BCN Main Line. The enclosed land has no pedestrian or vehicular access. Icknield Port (Loop) takes its name from the Roman Icknield Street which passed nearby, the exact route of which is unknown.

The Canal & River Trust (formerly British Waterways) depot with its buildings and crane are Grade II listed buildings.

Redevelopment plan
Birmingham City Council has plans for the regeneration of the area, including moorings, 1,150 new homes, shops, park and playground, and a ten-storey hotel.

In recent years, the loop has been developed by award winning developer, Urban Splash.  The first stage of a multi stage masterplan has been completed. Building works are ongoing for hundreds of further homes. The final stages will include shops and bars as part of the development.

There is a mixture of houses on the development, the majority of the development so far being 'row house' and a selection of limited edition brick houses.

The development has been awarded winners of Best regeneration initiative at Housebuilder Awards and Placemaking Project of the Year at Midlands Business Insider Residential Awards 2020.

See also

Soho Loop

References

External links

Icknield Port Loop development plans

Birmingham Canal Navigations
Canals in England
Canals in the West Midlands (county)
History of Birmingham, West Midlands
Canals opened in 1769